Junction City is a 1952 American Western film directed by Ray Nazarro and starring Charles Starrett, Smiley Burnette and Jock Mahoney. It was produced and distributed by Columbia Pictures. The film's art direction was by Charles Clague.

Plot

Cast
 Charles Starrett as Steve Rollins / Durango Kid  
 Smiley Burnette as Smiley  
 Jock Mahoney as Jack Mahoney  
 Kathleen Case as Penny Clinton  
 John Dehner as Emmett Sanderson  
 Steve Darrell as Black Murphy  
 George Chesebro as Sheriff Jeff Clinton  
 Anita Castle as Penelope Clinton  
 Mary Newton as Ella Sanderson  
 Robert Bice as Bleaker  
 Hal Price as Sheriff  
 Hal Taliaferro as Sandy Clinton  
 Chris Alcaide as Jarvis  
 Bob Woodward as Keely  
 Frank Ellis as Henchman

References

Bibliography
 Gene Freese. Jock Mahoney: The Life and Films of a Hollywood Stuntman. McFarland, 2013.

External links
 

1952 films
1952 Western (genre) films
1950s English-language films
American Western (genre) films
Films directed by Ray Nazarro
Columbia Pictures films
American black-and-white films
1950s American films